Deltapapillomavirus is a genus of viruses, in the family Papillomaviridae. Ruminants serve as natural hosts. There are seven species in this genus. Diseases associated with this genus include: warts (papillomas and fibropapillomas) of the skin and alimentary tract (rarely cancers of the alimentary tract and urinary bladder); possibly responsible for the skin tumour equine sarcoid in horses and donkeys.

Taxonomy
The following seven species are assigned to the genus:
 Deltapapillomavirus 1
 Deltapapillomavirus 2
 Deltapapillomavirus 3
 Deltapapillomavirus 4
 Deltapapillomavirus 5
 Deltapapillomavirus 6
 Deltapapillomavirus 7

Structure
Viruses in Deltapapillomavirus are non-enveloped, with icosahedral geometries. The diameter is around 60 nm. Genomes are circular, around 8kb in length.

Life cycle
Viral replication is nuclear. Entry into the host cell is achieved by attachment of the viral proteins to host receptors, which mediates endocytosis. Replication follows the dsDNA bidirectional replication model. Dna templated transcription, with some alternative splicing mechanism is the method of transcription. The virus exits the host cell by nuclear envelope breakdown.
Ruminants serve as the natural host. Transmission routes are contact.

References

External links

 ICTV Report Papillomaviridae
 Viralzone: Deltapapillomavirus

Papillomavirus
Virus genera